William Graham may refer to:

Politics and government 
 Sir William de Graham, 12th-century Scottish knight
 William Graham, 1st Earl of Montrose (1464–1513), Scottish nobleman
 William Graham, 2nd Earl of Montrose (died 1571), Scottish nobleman
 William Graham, 2nd Duke of Montrose (1712–1790), Scottish nobleman
 William Graham, 3rd Earl of Menteith (died 1543), Scottish magnate
 William Graham, 5th Earl of Menteith, 16th-century Scottish nobleman
 William Graham, 7th Earl of Menteith (1591–1661), Scottish nobleman
 William Graham, 8th Earl of Menteith (c. 1634–1694), Scottish nobleman
 William Graham (colonel) (1742–1835), North Carolina militia and political leader
 William Graham (Indiana politician) (1782–1858), U.S. representative from Indiana
 William Graham (Glasgow MP) (1817–1885), Scottish politician
 William Graham (Edinburgh MP) (1887–1932), British statesman
 William Graham (Welsh politician) (born 1949), assembly member from South Wales East
 William Alexander Graham (1804–1875), North Carolina governor, Secretary of the Navy  and U.S. senator
 William Australia Graham (1841–1916), New Zealand surveyor, mediator, farmer, politician and mayor
 William A. Graham (agriculture commissioner) (1839–1923), North Carolina politician
 William A. Graham (dean) (born 1943), American scholar of Middle Eastern studies
 William Harrison Graham (1844–1923), U.S. representative from Pennsylvania
 William J. Graham (1872–1937), U.S. representative from Illinois
 William Joseph Graham (1877–1963), American insurance executive
 William M. Graham (politician) (1819–1886), New York politician
 William Robert Graham (born 1937), former NASA administrator
 William Graham (Queensland politician) (1836–1892),

Sports

Association football
 William Graham (winger), English footballer who played as a winger
 William Graham (footballer, born 1914) (1914–1996), English footballer who played as an inside forward
 Willie Graham (footballer, born 1866) (1866–1937), Scottish footballer
 Willie Graham (footballer, born 1959), Northern Irish footballer

Other sports
 William Graham (American football) (born 1959), American football player
 William Graham (cricketer) (1881–1961), New Zealand cricketer
 William Graham (field hockey) (1886–1947), Irish Olympic field hockey player
 William Woodman Graham (c. 1859–after 1932), British mountaineer

Other fields 
 William Graham (British Army officer) (died 1747), British Army officer
 William Montrose Graham (1834–1916), major general in the United States Army
 William H. Graham (journalist) (died 1951), American war correspondent
 Franklin Graham (William Franklin Graham III, born 1952), evangelist and missionary
 William Graham (Royal Navy officer) (1826–1907), British admiral
 William Graham (actor), known for his 1947 film Just William's Luck
 William Graham (director) (1926–2013), film director
 William Pratt Graham (1871–1962), electrical engineering professor
 Will Graham (evangelist) (William Franklin Graham IV, born 1975), son of Franklin and grandson of Billy
 Will Graham (producer), American producer, director, screenwriter

Fiction 
 Will Graham (character), fictional character in the novel Red Dragon by Thomas Harris

See also
 Bill Graham (disambiguation) for those known as Bill or Billy
 SS William A. Graham, a 1942 World War II Liberty ship
 William Grahame (disambiguation)